Southern University Bangladesh is a private university in Chittagong, Bangladesh.

Almost since it became a university in 2002, it has been at odds with the University Grants Commission (UGC). The main issues have been the university's opening of unauthorized branch campuses, their failure to establish a permanent campus on time, and a dysfunctional board of trustees split by internal conflicts.

The UGC has warned students against enrolling at Southern University Bangladesh in 2014. According to the instructions of the Ministry of Education's letter dated 28/07/2019 and 02/09/2019, due to the stay of Court in the writ case No.18784/2017 filed by Southern University Bangladesh, 13/12/  The order dated 2017 was revoked on 09/09/2019.  It is to be noted that the declaratory case 402/16 related to the ownership of this university, the writ case 18784/2017 related to non-admission of students and the writ case 7326/2018 related to the award of asterisk(*) displayed on the Commission's website has been lifted. (http://www.ugc.gov.bd) The honorable court granted stay for 01 (one) year from 11/01/2019 latest in Writ Case No. 18784/2017 and for 01 (one) year from 19/05/2019 in Writ Case No. 7326/2018.

List of vice-chancellors 

 Prof. Mozammel Haque ( April 2021 – present )

History
The Institute of Management and Information Technology was established in 1998. Sarwar Jahan and Ishrat Jahan obtained approval in 2002 from the Ministry of Education to elevate the institute to a private university, named Southern University Bangladesh. Academic activities began in January 2003.

In October 2004, a blue-ribbon panel formed by the education ministry and headed by M. Asaduzzaman, Chairman of the UGC, recommended shutting down Southern University and seven other private universities because they violated the Private University Act, 1992. A judicial body formed to follow up on the allegations against the private universities reiterated in January 2005 the recommendation to close Southern University.

The Daily Star reported in 2006 that the university had opened branch campuses in Dhaka, Jessore, and Rangpur without the approval of the UGC. A decade later, the number of illegal campuses it was operating had grown to seven, in Chittagong, Dhaka, Khulna, Kushtia, and Rangpur.

The university had been approved in 2002 on the condition that they establish a permanent campus within five years. By December 2010, the university had purchased sufficient land for a campus, but had not yet begun construction. The education ministry threatened not to allow them to enroll new students unless they moved to their own campus by September 2011. Deadlines were extended four times, and by 2017 construction was underway.

In 2014, the Dhaka Tribune described the university's board of trustees as "driven by conflict". Two court cases involving rival factions on the board were still pending in 2018.

Starting in 2014, the UGC repeatedly warned students that Southern University was operating without approval, and they should be cautious about enrolling at such "crisis-torn universities". Their degrees might not be recognized, and the UGC and education ministry would not accept responsibility if students got into difficulties.

Administration and organization
The university is administered by the Southern University Bangladesh Trust.

A.J.M. Nuruddin Chowdhury was vice-chancellor at the time of the university's first convocation, in 2010. Mohammad Ali served as vice-chancellor from about 2011 to 2016. Nurul Mustafa became vice-chancellor in 2016, and was succeeded by Mozammel Haque in April 2021.

Academics

Departments and Programs
 Department of Business Administration 
Bachelor of Business Administration (BBA)
Master of Business Administration (MBA)
Bachelor of Hotel & Tourism Management (HTM)
Executive Master of Business Administration (EMBA)

 Department of Computer Science
Bachelor of Computer Sc. (B.Sc. in CS)
Master of Science in Computer Sc. (M.S. in CS)

 Department of Civil Engineering
Bachelor of Civil Engineering (B.Sc. in CE)

 Department of Electronic & Communication Engineering
Bachelor of Science in Electronic & Communication Engineering (B.Sc. in ECE)

 Department of Electrical & Electronic Engineering
Bachelor of Electrical and Electronic Engineering (B.Sc. in EEE)

 Department of Pharmacy
Bachelor of Pharmacy (B. Pharm)

 Department of Law
Bachelor of Law (LLB 4 Years)
Bachelor of Law (LLB 2 Years)
Master of Laws (LLM)

 Department of English
Bachelor of Arts in English (B.A. in English)
Master of Arts in English (M.A. in English)

 Department of Islamic Studies
Master of Arts in Islamic Studies (MA in IS)

Research
The UGC found that the university spent nothing on research in 2012, which is a violation of the Private University Act 2010.

According to the university, it publishes three annual peer-reviewed journals: The Journal of Business and Society (JBS) , The Journal of Engineering and Science (JES) , and The Journal of General Education (JGEd) .

Footnotes

External links
 Southern University Bangladesh
 Southern University on UGC

Educational institutions established in 1998
Private universities in Bangladesh
1998 establishments in Bangladesh
Education in Chittagong